Brain Assist or Touch de Uno DS is a puzzle video game released for the Nintendo DS in Japan, North America, and the PAL regions.  Studies in the 1960s demonstrated the lateralization of brain function. The left-brain hemisphere deals with sequential analysis - reasoning using language, mathematics, abstraction and reasoning. Memory is primarily stored in a language format. The right-brain hemisphere deals with auditory, visual, and spatial concepts (art, for example) dancing and gymnastics, which is what the game aims to stimulate in the player.

Reception

Brain Assist received mixed reviews from critics upon release. On Metacritic, the game holds a score of 53/100 based on 17 reviews, indicating "mixed or average reviews". On GameRankings, the game holds a score of 53.89% based on 19 reviews.

References

External links
GameSpot Summary

2007 video games
2008 video games
Brain training video games
Japan Art Media games
Multiplayer and single-player video games
Nintendo DS games
Nintendo DS-only games
Puzzle video games
Sega video games
Video games developed in Japan